Margit Kövessi (1 September 1907 – 30 August 1992) was a Hungarian gymnast. She competed in the women's artistic team all-around event at the 1928 Summer Olympics.

References

1907 births
1992 deaths
Hungarian female artistic gymnasts
Olympic gymnasts of Hungary
Gymnasts at the 1928 Summer Olympics
People from Banská Štiavnica
Sportspeople from the Banská Bystrica Region